Benjamin Castro may refer to:

Benjamin Brian Castro (1989-), American actor and singer
Benjamín de Arriba y Castro (1886–1973), Spanish Catholic cardinal